Iraq Today is a newspaper in Iraq.

History
It is the first domestic English-language newspaper published in Iraq since the fall of Saddam Hussein. 

The newspaper's first issue was published on 9 April 2003. Its tagline is "The Independent Voice of Iraq".

See also

 List of newspapers in Iraq

External links
  , the newspaper's official website

2003 establishments in Iraq
English-language newspapers published in Arab countries
Newspapers published in Iraq
Publications established in 2003